Puerto Rican businessperson

Carlos Rivas Quiñones is an attorney, banker and economist, and a former  director of the Puerto Rico Office of Management and Budget.  Rivas currently serves as Senior Vice President in the mortgage business at Banco Popular de Puerto Rico. Rivas was previously the executive director of the Puerto Rico Financing of Housing Authority, a principal at the private equity fund Advent Morro Equity Partners, and a strategic management consultant at McKinsey and Company. Rivas hold a juris doctor from Stanford University, where focused on securities, corporate and transactional law, and a graduated with a bachelor's degree in economics from Princeton University.

Notes

References

Directors of the Puerto Rico Office of Management and Budget
Members of the 16th Cabinet of Puerto Rico
Puerto Rican lawyers
Puerto Rican economists
Living people
Princeton University alumni
Stanford Law School alumni
Year of birth missing (living people)